Faith Rivera (born Esther Faith Rivera, Waimea, Hawaii) is an American singer-songwriter. Rivera founded the independent record label and publishing company Lil' Girl Creations in 1996.

Rivera learned to play the piano in the first grade at her alma mater Sacred Hearts Academy in Honolulu, Hawaii, and wrote her first song at the age of 13. She joined an all female band called APB under the instruction of Brian Albus, owner and instructor of Rock Works School of Rock in Hawaii. Rivera performed at local malls with her band from the age of 14 to 18. She then attended the College of Notre Dame in Belmont, California and transferred to the California State University, Long Beach where she earned her BA in Commercial Music.

Rivera performed in her first musical in 2011 alongside an all-star cast including Shirley Jones and Betty Buckley. The Real Love: A New Musical was created with the poetry of Supreme Master Ching Hai and set to music by Oscar & 5-time Emmy winner Bill Conti (“Rocky”), 2-time Oscar winner Al Kasha (“The Poseidon Adventure”), Emmy nominee Doug Katsaros, Tony & Emmy winner Don Pippin (“Oliver!”), and Oscar & 2-time Grammy winner David Shire (“Baby”).

She serves as a Peace Ambassador for Fine & Performing Artists for World Peace and was named the 2008 Biggest Giver for Humanity Unites Brilliance that provided food, water, education & micro-loans to women and children around the globe. Rivera received the 2012 Grace Note Award  honoring her contribution to the New Thought movement.

Awards

|-
| style="text-align:center;"|2002
||"Kumbaya"
| Dance Song of the Year - Just Plain Folks 
| 
|-
| style="text-align:center;"|2003
||"Forever Near" with John Henry Kreitler
| Emmy Award - Outstanding Original Song - Passions
| 
|-
| style="text-align:center;"|2006
| |"Colors of Praise"
| Most Uniting Song - EmpowerMA Posi Award
| 
|-
| style="text-align:center;"|2006
| |"Vision"
| Contemporary Song - Just Plain Folks
| 
|-
| style="text-align:center;"|2006
| |"Song of One"
| World Song - Just Plain Folks
| 
|-
| style="text-align:center;"|2006
| |"Suncatcher" (album)
| New Age Album of the Year - Just Plain Folks 
| 
|-
| style="text-align:center;"|2007
| |"Kumbaya"
| Personal Transformation Song - EmpowerMA Posi Award
| 
|-
| style="text-align:center;"|2007
| |"Standing As One" with Conneta Johnson
| Most Uniting Song - EmpowerMA Posi Award
| 
|-
| style="text-align:center;"|2009
| |"Stand Together" with Harold Payne
| Most Uniting Song - EmpowerMA Posi Award
| 
|-
| style="text-align:center;"|2010
| |"God Is"
| Most Healing Song - EmpowerMA Posi Award
| 
|-
| style="text-align:center;"|2011
| |"Together (The Truth)" with Shawn Gallaway
| Most Uniting Song - EmpowerMA Posi Award
| 
|-
| style="text-align:center;"|2012
| |Honoree
| Grace Note Award - Unity Worldwide Ministries
| 
|-
| style="text-align:center;"|2018
| |"Over and Over Again"
| Relationships - EmpowerMA Posi Award
| 
|-
| style="text-align:center;"|2019
| |"Rise"
| Uniting - EmpowerMA Posi Award
|

Discography

Faith has worked with:

MUSIC ARTISTS
Daniel Ho, Neil Young, Luther Vandross, Rickie Byars Beckwith, Andre Merritt, Ernie Halter, Sheila E., Brian Stokes Mitchell, Betty Buckley, Shirley Jones, Gerald White, Harold Payne, Ali Handal & more...

AUTHORS & SPEAKERS
Michael Beckwith, Marianne Williamson, Jack Canfield, Mary Manin Morrissey,Barbara Marx Hubbard, Neale Donald Walsch, Terry Cole Whittaker, Dannion Brinkley and more...

Albums

References

Living people
New Thought mass media
New Thought people
Year of birth missing (living people)
Singer-songwriters from Hawaii